The 1989 European Super Cup was the 14th European Super Cup, an annual football match contested by the winners of the previous season's European Cup and European Cup Winners' Cup competitions. The 1989 Super Cup was played on a home-and-away basis, and was contested by Milan, winners of the 1988–89 European Cup, and Barcelona, who had won the 1988–89 European Cup Winners' Cup. After a 1–1 draw in the first leg at the Camp Nou in Barcelona, Milan won 1–0 at home to secure a 2–1 aggregate win and their first Super Cup.

Match details

First leg

Second leg

See also
1994 UEFA Champions League Final – contested between same teams
A.C. Milan in European football
FC Barcelona in international football competitions

References

External links
Summary from UEFA
Summary from RSSSF

Super Cup
1989
Super Cup 1989
Super Cup 1989
Super Cup 1989
Super Cup 1989
Super Cup
Super Cup
European Super Cup
European Super Cup
1980s in Milan
1980s in Barcelona
Sports competitions in Barcelona
Sports competitions in Milan